Zillingdorf is a municipality in the district of Wiener Neustadt-Land in the Austrian state of Lower Austria.

Population

References

Cities and towns in Wiener Neustadt-Land District